Iván Mateo Silva (born 4 August 1981) is a Spanish footballer who plays for AD Unión Adarve as a winger.

Club career
Born in Madrid, Mateo made his senior debuts with local Atlético Aviación in the 2000–01 season, in Tercera División. After four full campaigns will the club he first arrived in Segunda División B, signing with neighbouring RSD Alcalá.

In the 2005 summer Mateo joined Hércules CF in Segunda División. On 31 August he made his professional debut, starting in a 0–1 home loss against Gimnàstic de Tarragona for the campaign's Copa del Rey; his league debut came on 20 November as he played the last ten minutes of a 0–4 loss at Lorca Deportiva CF, and in January 2006 he was loaned to Cultural y Deportiva Leonesa in the third level, signing permanently in July.

Mateo continued to compete in division three but also in Tercera División in the following seasons, representing CF Badalona, Alcalá, CD Guijuelo, CD Toledo (achieving promotion to the third tier in 2013 by appearing in 32 matches and scoring three goals), Fútbol Alcobendas Sport and AD Unión Adarve.

References

External links

1981 births
Living people
Footballers from Madrid
Spanish footballers
Association football wingers
Segunda División players
Segunda División B players
Tercera División players
Atlético Madrid C players
Hércules CF players
Cultural Leonesa footballers
CF Badalona players
CD Guijuelo footballers
CD Toledo players
RSD Alcalá players